Plaskett is a thinly populated oceanside hamlet alongside the Big Sur Coast Highway in the southern Big Sur region of Monterey County, California.  It lies at an elevation of 203 feet (62 m). It consists of a USFS campground and station, two small resorts, a small school, and a few dozen families spread over the general region.

Attractions and services

Camping and hiking 

The USFS Plaskett Creek Campground has 44 campsites. The campground is on the east side of Highway 1 in a forest of Monterey Pine, Cypress, and Cedar trees. There are three group campsites for tent and RV camping. There are no hookups or a dump station. Each site is equipped with a table and campfire ring with grill. Flush toilets, sinks and drinking water are provided throughout the campground. Camping alongside Highway 1 or other local roads is illegal. Due to high fire danger, campfires and BBQ usage are only permitted in designated campgrounds.

The campground is walking distance to Sand Dollar Beach, the longest publicly accessible strand of sandy beach along the Big Sur coast. A quarter mile south of the Plaskett Creek Campground, there is a  coastal trail from Jade Cove to Plaskett Rock Point.

There are restrooms and a public telephone. There is no cell coverage or wifi service in the area. The Treebones Resort  to the south offers high-end accommodations in yurts and meals at the Wild Coast Restaurant.

Junge Cabin

The Junge Cabin, a one-room redwood cabin built in 1920 by homesteader John Junge, is found in Pacific Valley.

Jade Cove 

There is a steep  trail from the Plaskett Campground to Jade Cove that ends in a rope-assisted drop to the beach. The beach can be dangerous during high tides and storms. Individuals may remove only what they can individually carry. Only hand tools are permitted.

Education 

The Pacific Valley School offers K-12 education to south coast residents. In 2017–18, the school had 22 students and a student/teacher ratio of 3:1.

Etymology 

The family name is connected to Plaskett Creek, Plaskett Creek Campground, Plaskett Rock, Plaskett Ridge, and Plaskett Ridge Road. Two plant specimens were also named for the family: Nemophila plaskettii and Linanthus plaskettii, which today are recognized as synonyms for Nemophila parviflora, also known as Baby Blue Eyes.

Government
At the county level, Plaskett is represented on the Monterey County Board of Supervisors by Supervisor Dave Potter.

In the United States House of Representatives, Plaskett is in

References

Unincorporated communities in California
Unincorporated communities in Monterey County, California
Populated coastal places in California